Cuaming is an island located at the Cebu Strait, in the Visayas region, Philippines. It is part of the islands situated in the Danajon Bank, the country's only double barrier reef. The island's residents are mostly dependent entirely on fishing. Cuaming is one of the most densely populated islands in the Philippines.

Government
The island is locally governed by Barangay Cuaming, under the jurisdiction of the municipal government of Inabanga, Bohol.

Geography

Demographics
According to the latest 2020 census, Cuaming has a population of 3,263, making it the most populated barangay in the town of Inabanga.

Recent History

On April, 2021, the National Power Corporation (NAPOCOR) plans to install a renewable energy (RE) - diesel hybrid power plant in Cuaming Island. This is under the NAPOCOR's RE program in off-grid areas. 

On December, 2021, Cuaming is one of the areas that was badly affected by the onslaught of Typhoon Rai or known as Super Typhoon Odette in the Philippines. Many houses and infrastructure was damaged. The local government provided relief aid, including food and water to the residents of Cuaming days after the tropical cyclone. Also, a non-profit foundation donated fishing boats to affected fisherfolk, who lost them after the disaster.

Education
Cuaming Island has two public schools.
 Cuaming Elementary School 
 Cuaming High School

Utilities

Electricity

The National Power Corporation - Small Power Utilities Group has a diesel power plant in Cuaming Island. Bohol I Electronic Cooperative, Inc. is in charge distributing electricity to the houses in the island.

See also
 List of islands by population density

References 

Islands of Bohol